Daniele Danesin (born 7 December 1985 in Como) is an Italian rower, who has won five gold medals at various World Rowing Championships.  He has also represented Italy at the 2012 Summer Olympics. After rowing, Daniele moved to New Zealand  and became a ultra marathon runner.

References

 

1985 births
Living people
Italian male rowers
Sportspeople from Como
Rowers at the 2012 Summer Olympics
Olympic rowers of Italy
World Rowing Championships medalists for Italy